This is a partial list of recreational walks in the county of Derbyshire in England. The list includes walks that are wholly inside Derbyshire and also those that pass through to other counties. The walks are generally through countryside on a variety of trails and footpaths. Small walks of only local interest are not included.

List of walking trails in Derbyshire

See also

Long-distance footpaths in the UK
 List of parks and open spaces in Derbyshire

References

External links
Peak District Derbyshire Walk Download Page

Footpaths in Derbyshire
Derbyshire
British entertainment-related lists

Derbyshire-related lists